The 1980 Wake Forest Demon Deacons football team was an American football team that represented Wake Forest University during the 1980 NCAA Division I-A football season. In its third season under head coach John Mackovic, the team compiled a 5–6 record and finished in a three-way tie for fourth place in the Atlantic Coast Conference.

Schedule

Roster

Team leaders

References

Wake Forest
Wake Forest Demon Deacons football seasons
Wake Forest Demon Deacons football